Usman Rafiq (born  August 13, 1988) is an American cricketer. In January 2018, he was named in the United States squad for the 2017–18 Regional Super50 tournament in the West Indies. He made his List A debut for the United States against Guyana in the 2017–18 Regional Super50 on February 2, 2018. In June 2021, he was selected to take part in the Minor League Cricket tournament in the United States following the players' draft.

References

External links
 

1988 births
Living people
American cricketers
Place of birth missing (living people)